Sport Club Corinthians can refer to the following association football clubs:

Sport Club Corinthians Alagoano, from Maceió, Alagoas, Brazil
Sport Club Corinthians Paulista, from São Paulo, São Paulo state, Brazil
Sport Club Corinthians Paranaense, from São José dos Pinhais, Paraná state, Brazil